Life pool (also known as 3 lives Snooker) was a form of pocket billiards (pool) mainly played in the 19th century. Its rules were first recorded in 1819 simply as pool which remained its most common name among the British for about a century. In the United States, it was also simply called "pool" in the mid-19th century. It was one of several pool games that were popular at this time (so called because gamblers pooled their bets at the start of play). The object of the game was to be the last player left "alive" and therefore scoop the pool (take the winnings). Each player had three "lives" to begin with and would lose one when another player potted their  which was designated to them at the start of the game. Using the same number of balls as players, players take turns striking their designated ball with the cue in an attempt to collide that ball with one (or more) of their opponents' balls knocking the opponent ball into a pocket. Once a player lost their three lives, they were declared "dead", i.e. out of the game. The game continued in this way until there was only one player left, who was declared the winner. Around 1862, life pool spawned black pool, an ancestor of snooker, today one of the most popular cue sports in the world.

References

Pool (cue sports)
History of snooker